Zoeken naar Eileen is a 1987 Dutch film directed by Rudolf van den Berg. The international title of the film is Looking for Eileen, and is based on the book Zoeken naar Eileen W., written by Leon de Winter.

British actress Lysette Anthony played both Marian Faber (dubbed by Marijke Veugelers) and the title character Eileen.

Plot

Philip de Wit becomes depressed after his young wife, Marian Faber, dies in a car accident. A year later while working in his late wife's bookstore, he briefly encounters a woman who closely resembles Marian. He becomes obsessed to find her, knowing only that she speaks English, is from Northern Ireland, and is called Eileen.
He discovers that he is not the only person looking for Eileen.

Cast

 Thom Hoffman - Philip de Wit 
 Lysette Anthony - Marian Faber / Eileen W.
 Garry Whelan - Mark Nolan 
 Kenneth Herdigein - Geoffrey 
 John van Dreelen - Philips father 
 Hans Kemna - Henk Faber

External links 
 Zoeken naar Eileen (1987) IMDB

Dutch thriller drama films
1987 films
1980s Dutch-language films
Films based on Dutch novels
1980s thriller drama films